The Vermont Bar Association (VBA) is a voluntary bar association for the state of Vermont.

History
Founded in September 1878 in Montpelier, the Vermont Bar Association remains the only professional organization for lawyers, judges, paralegals and law students in Vermont.

Presidents
The first President of the Vermont Bar Association was Edward J. Phelps.  Past Presidents of the Vermont Bar Association include prominent judges, political leaders, military leaders and diplomats.  The Presidents of the Vermont Bar Association have included:

1878 Edward John Phelps
1879 Luke P. Poland 
1880 Walter C. Dunton
1881 Daniel Roberts 
1882 James Barrett
1883 Benjamin F. Fifield 
1884 Aldace F. Walker 
1885 George N. Dale 
1886 Charles H. Heath 
1887 Roswell Farnham
1888 Philip K. Gleed 
1889 Laforrest H. Thompson
1890 Henry R. Start
1891 Joel C. Baker 
1892 Levant M. Read 
1893 Charles M. Wilds 
1894 William B. C. Stickney 
1895 Charles A. Prouty
1896 Eleazer L. Waterman
1897 Charles P. Hogan 
1898 Wendell P. Stafford 
1899 Charles Hial Darling 
1900 Jonathan Ross 
1901 John Young 
1902 John H. Senter 
1903 Wilder L. Burnap
1904 William W. Stickney 
1905 H. Henry Powers
1906 Fred M. Butler 
1907 Alexander Dunnett 
1908 James K. Batchelder
1909 Chauncey G. Austin 
1910 James Manning Tyler 
1911 Rufus E. Brown 
1912 Clarke C. Fitts 
1913-1914 John W. Rowell 
1915 Charles D. Watson
1916 John W. Gordon
1917 George B. Young
1918 Robert E. Healy
1919 John G. Sargent
1920 Marvelle C. Webber
1921 John W. Redmond
1922 Edwin W. Lawrence
1923 Warren R. Austin
1924 Stanley C. Wilson
1925 J. Rolf Searles
1926 S. Hollister Jackson
1927 James K. Batchelder (acting)
1927 Walter S. Fenton
1928 George M. Hogan
1929 Homer L. Skeels
1930 Bert L. Stafford
1930 George L. Hunt
1931 Guy M. Page
1932 Walter H. Cleary
1933 Fred E. Gleason
1934 Collins M. Graves
1935 J. Ward Carver
1936 Charles F. Black
1937 Arthur L. Graves
1938 James Patrick Leamy
1939 Neil D. Clawson
1940 Sherman R. Moulton
1940 Horace H. Powers
1941 Joseph A. McNamara
1942 Deane C. Davis
1943 Frank E. Barber
1944 A. Pearley Feen
1945 Leonard F. Wing
1945 Paul A. Chase
1946 Harold C. Sylvester
1947 Harold I. O’Brien
1948-1949 Osmer C. Fitts 
1949-1950 Norton Barber  
1951-1952 William H. Edmunds 
1952-1953 F. Ray Keyser Sr.
1954-1955 William H. Adams 
1955-1956 R. Clarke Smith 
1956-1957 Henry F. Black 
1957-1958 Sterry R. Waterman 
1959-1960 Clifton G. Parker 
1960-1961 A. Luke Crispe 
1962-1963 J. Boone Wilson 
1963-1964 Christopher A. Webber 
1966-1967 Louis G. Whitcomb
1967-1968 Hilton A. Wick 
1968-1969 J. Malcolm Williams
1969-1970 Robert K. Bing 
1970-1971 John D. Carbine  
1971-1972 James L. Oakes 
1972-1973 Ralph A. Foote 
1973-1974 Peter P. Plante 
1974-1975 John H. Downs  
1975-1976 James S. Brock 
1976-1977 Clarke A. Gravel 
1977-1978 James T. Haugh
1978-1979 John M. Dinse 
1979-1980 Chester S. Ketcham 
1980-1981 Harvey B. Otterman Jr. 
1981-1982 Wynn Underwood 
1982-1983 Donald H. Hackel
1983-1984 Joseph E. Frank 
1984-1985 Leonard F. Wing Jr.
1985-1986 John G. Kristensen 
1986-1987 John B. Webber 
1987-1988 Ellen Mercer Fallon 
1988-1989 John A. Dooley 
1989-1990 Douglas Richards 
1990-1991 Edwin H. Amidon Jr.
1991-1992 Ellen Holmes Maloney
1992-1993 Michael B. Clapp
1993-1994 William J. Reedy
1994-1995 Jan S. Eastman
1995-1996 Peter W. Hall
1996-1997 Joan Loring Wing
1997-1998 Wendy Morgan
1998-1999 Emily S. Davis
1999-2000 Jon R. Eggleston
2000-2001 Dorothy Helling
2001-2002 Matthew Valerio
2002-2003 Donald Rendall Jr.
2003-2004 Anna Saxman
2004-2005 Thomas Zonay
2005-2006 James Gallagher
2006-2007 Samuel Hoar Jr.
2007-2008 S. Stacy Chapman III
2008-2009 Douglas L. Molde 
2009-2010 Eileen M. Blackwood
2010-2011 Therese M. Corsones
2011-2012 James F. Carroll
2012-2013 Amber L. Barber
2013-2014 David R. Fenster
2014-2015 Daniel P. Richardson
2015-2016 Jennifer R. Emens-Butler
2016-2017 Michael E. Kennedy
2018-2019 Gary L. Franklin
2019-2020 Elizabeth F. Novotny
2020-2021 Elizabeth A. Kruska
2021-2022 Robert E. Fletcher

References

External links
 Official website

Vermont
Organizations established in 1878
1878 establishments in Vermont